Iker Pajares Bernabeu, (born March 22, 1996 in Barcelona) is a professional squash player who represents Spain. He reached a career-high world ranking of World No. 33 in February 2020.

References

External links 

Spanish male squash players
Living people
1996 births